Karan Romesh Sharma (born 26 October 1981) is an Indo-Mauritian actor. His first and only film to date was released in 2005 Bollywood film Dil Jo Bhi Kahey... starring opposite Amitabh Bachchan which was directed and co-produced by his father Romesh Sharma. In 2003, he did a Mauritian series C'est la vie, which was telecast in Mauritius.

Personal life
He is the son of Indian film producer Romesh Sharma. He was married to Aliksha Anand, the daughter of Indian film director Mukul S. Anand. He is currently married to Indu Kumar Sharma, the daughter of Rakesh Sharma, director of films such as Mr. Natwarlal, Do Aur Do Paanch, Khoon Pasina and Yaarana among others. His sister Neema Sharma is married to Amjad Ali Khan's son Ayaan Ali Khan.

Filmography
 1987 - Diljalaa
 2003 - C'est La Vie (Mauritian TV Series)
 2005 - Dil Jo Bhi Kahey... as Jai Sinha (Film)

References

External links
 
 
 

Indian male film actors
Indian people of Mauritian descent
1981 births
Living people